Devon Partnership NHS Trust is a mental health trust established in 2001. It provides mental health and learning disability services in Devon (excluding Plymouth), England.

Services 
In December 2016, the trust announced that it had applied for planning permission to build a brand new, £5.5million psychiatric intensive-care unit (PICU) in Exeter: work on site stated in November 2017.

Performance
The trust was last inspected by the Care Quality Commission (CQC) in June-July 2019: the report was published in October 2019 and its overall rating was 'Good'.

References

External links 
 
 CQC inspection reports

NHS mental health trusts
Health in Devon